The White House, also known as White Residence, at 176 Robineau Road in Syracuse, New York was added to the National Register of Historic Places in 1997.

It was designed by Ward Wellington Ward.

References

Houses in Syracuse, New York
National Register of Historic Places in Syracuse, New York
Houses on the National Register of Historic Places in New York (state)
Houses completed in 1919